, born , was a Japanese professional sumo wrestler from Hiroshima. He was the sport's 37th yokozuna.

Career

Akinoumi made his professional debut in February 1932 and reached the top makuuchi division in January 1938. He was the man who ended Futabayama's record 69 bout winning streak in January 1939. As he was only ranked as a maegashira at the time, it was regarded as an enormous upset. He defeated the yokozuna by sotogake, an outer leg trip. He had practiced this technique in training with Komanosato, who had been Futabayama's 69th and final defeated opponent. He was overwhelmed by his achievement, but was told by his stablemaster, "Become a rikishi not to be praised when he wins but to cause an uproar when he loses."

His only top division championship came in May 1940 when he was ranked as a sekiwake. He earned promotion to yokozuna in May 1942 after two runner-up performances of 13 wins against two losses. He was promoted simultaneously with Terukuni. Akinoumi was not a particularly successful yokozuna, lasting only eight tournaments at the rank and not managing to win any further championships. He is arguably better remembered for his victory over Futabayama than his exploits as a grand champion.

Retirement from sumo
Akinoumi retired in November 1946, and became an elder of the Japan Sumo Association with the name of Fujishima. He married the daughter of Dewanoumi Oyakata, the former yokozuna Tsunenohana, but was unfaithful to her, his geisha mistress giving birth the same day that his wife did. They were later divorced. This put an end to any hopes of becoming the head of Dewanoumi stable, and he left the sumo world in January 1955. He later remarried. He ran a chanko restaurant, and when that went out of business, a clothing store. He also appeared as a sumo commentator on broadcasts of tournaments. He celebrated his 60th birthday in 1974 but for reasons which are unclear, did not get to perform the kanreki dohyō-iri ceremony. He died in 1979 of congestive heart failure.

Career record

Through most of the 1930s and 1940s only two tournaments were held a year, and in 1946 only one was held.

See also
Glossary of sumo terms
List of past sumo wrestlers
List of sumo tournament top division champions
List of yokozuna

References

External links 

 Japan Sumo Association profile

1914 births
1979 deaths
Japanese sumo wrestlers
Sportspeople from Hiroshima
Sumo people from Hiroshima Prefecture
Yokozuna